St. Joseph Church is a historic Roman Catholic church on Spring Street in St. Joseph, Tennessee.

The Roman Catholic church in St. Joseph was established in 1872. Its first church building was a small
frame structure located near the current church. It housed a parochial school for many years and was being used for storage as of 1984.

The current church building is a large structure built in 1885 by the church's parishioners from ashlar cut stone that they had quarried at a nearby site. It has a stucco exterior and a square bell tower with a short octagonal steeple that is roofed with tin shingles. It has an unusually elaborate interior that is largely the work of John Sliemers, who served as the local parish priest from 1901 to 1903 and from 1914 to 1934. Both the  main altar and side altars have elaborate carvings, while lathe-turned balusters support the chancel rail and the rear gallery. Religious scenes are depicted in stained-glass windows and in paintings on the interior walls.

The 1885 church building was added to the National Register of Historic Places in 1984.

References

Roman Catholic churches in Tennessee
Churches on the National Register of Historic Places in Tennessee
Roman Catholic churches completed in 1855
19th-century Roman Catholic church buildings in the United States
Buildings and structures in Lawrence County, Tennessee
National Register of Historic Places in Lawrence County, Tennessee